The Last Adventure (Italian: L'ultima avventura) is a 1932 Italian comedy film directed by Mario Camerini, starring Armando Falconi and Diomira Jacobini.

The film's sets were designed by the art director Gastone Medin.

Cast
 Armando Falconi as Armando  
 Diomira Jacobini as Lilly  
 Carlo Fontana as Paolo  
 Cesare Zoppetti as Battista  
 Nella Maria Bonora as Luisa  
 Giovanni Dolfini as Carlo - il cognato medico  
 Elisa Masi
 Rossana Masi
 Gemma Schirato as La zia  
 Elena Zoar as Giulia  
 Guglielmo Barnabò as Don Luigi - il prete  
 Ciro Galvani as Il padre di Paolo  
 Maria Della Lunga Mandarelli as Adriana  
 Pino Locchi as Giorgetto 
 Mino Doro 
 Gianfranco Giachetti 
 Isa Pola as Una ragazza di Rapallo  
 Carlo Romano as Don Gaetano - il notaio

References

Bibliography 
 Mark Shiel. Italian Neorealism: Rebuilding the Cinematic City. Columbia University Press, 2012.

External links 
 

1932 comedy films
Italian comedy films
1932 films
1930s Italian-language films
Films directed by Mario Camerini
Italian black-and-white films
1930s Italian films